Mercyful Fate is a Danish heavy metal band from Copenhagen, formed in 1981 by vocalist King Diamond and guitarist Hank Shermann. Influenced by progressive rock and hard rock, and with lyrics dealing with Satan and the occult, Mercyful Fate were part of the first wave of black metal in the early to mid-1980s, along with Venom and Bathory. Many of the bands from this movement went on to influence later black metal musicians in the 1990s, particularly in Norway. Mercyful Fate has also been cited as a prominent influence on the subsequent heavy metal scene of 1980s and 1990s, including thrash metal bands like Metallica, Slayer, Testament, Exodus and Kreator, and death metal bands such as Death, Morbid Angel, Obituary and Cannibal Corpse.

Since its inception in 1981, Mercyful Fate has released seven studio albums, two extended plays, and four compilations. After several line-up changes and self-made demos, they released their self-titled EP in 1982, with the line-up of King Diamond (vocals), Hank Shermann (lead and rhythm guitars), Michael Denner (rhythm and lead guitars), Timi Hansen (bass) and Kim Ruzz (drums). With this line-up the group recorded their first two studio albums (1983's Melissa and 1984's Don't Break the Oath); in spite of their reputation as one of the most acclaimed bands of the European heavy metal scene of the 1980s, Mercyful Fate were the subject of controversy due to their Satanic imagery, and one of their songs "Into the Coven" (from Melissa) later gained notoriety for appearing as one of the PMRC's "Filthy Fifteen" list of objectionable songs.

After disbanding in 1985 due to musical differences, four out of the five members of Mercyful Fate reunited in 1992 to record the album In the Shadows, which was released the following year. During the 1990s, the band released four more studio albums and went through several line-up changes. Mercyful Fate went on hiatus in 1999, but had reunited on occasion during the 2000s. On August 1, 2019, it was announced that Mercyful Fate were reuniting on a more permanent basis, with plans to tour and release a new album, which will be their first since 9 in 1999.

History

Formation and first releases (1981–1985)
Mercyful Fate was originally formed in Copenhagen, Denmark, in 1981, following the dissolution of the band Brats. Brats had been a punk/metal band, featuring future Mercyful Fate members, vocalist King Diamond, and guitarists Hank Shermann and Michael Denner. After two studio albums and several line-up changes (including the addition of Diamond and the departure of Denner), Diamond and Shermann began writing new material that was much heavier than any of Brats' previous work. The band's record label CBS was not pleased with the material, and demanded they stop singing in English and become more commercial. As a result, Diamond and Shermann quit the group and went on to form Mercyful Fate. Former Rock Nalle bassist Ole Beich (later of L.A. Guns and Guns N' Roses) briefly joined the band around this time. After several line-up changes and semi-professional demo tapes, Mercyful Fate released their self-titled EP in 1982. This line-up, consisting of King Diamond, Hank Shermann, bassist Timi Hansen, drummer Kim Ruzz and guitarist Michael Denner, would go on to record the group's first two studio albums.

In July 1983, Mercyful Fate recorded their debut album at Easy Sound Recording, in Copenhagen, Denmark. Entitled Melissa, the album was produced by Henrik Lund and released on October 30, 1983, on Roadrunner Records. The character of Melissa, a witch who was burned at the stake, appears for the first time on the eponymous debut album and intermittently throughout the band's later work. One of the album's tracks, "Into the Coven", received particular attention two years later, when it was listed by the Parents Music Resource Center (PMRC) as one of their "Filthy Fifteen" songs due to its perceived occult content. After a number of concerts around Denmark, Mercyful Fate entered the studio in May 1984 to record their second studio album Don't Break the Oath, which was released on September 7, 1984. During the album's supporting tour, the band played the US for two months and made festival appearances in Germany. Despite winning a cult following around the world, Mercyful Fate broke up in April 1985, due to musical differences. Guitarist Hank Shermann wanted the band to move to a more commercial sound; King Diamond refused and announced his departure from Mercyful Fate, which led to the band breaking-up.

After disbanding (1985–1992)

After Mercyful Fate broke up in 1985, King Diamond, along with Michael Denner and Timi Hansen, formed the eponymous King Diamond band. Both Denner and Hansen stayed with the group until 1987's Abigail, after which both left King Diamond. They were replaced by Mike Moon and Hal Patino, respectively, and King Diamond continued releasing albums even after Mercyful Fate had reformed. After leaving King Diamond, Michael Denner opened up a recordshop in Copenhagen, until 1988, when he formed the band Lavina (which would later become Zoser Mez), along with former bandmate Hank Shermann. Hank Shermann had formed the hard rock band Fate in 1985, after having left Mercyful Fate. With Fate, Shermann released two albums: 1985's Fate and 1986's A Matter of Attitude. After leaving the band, Shermann joined-up with Michael Denner to form Lavina.

During the time Mercyful Fate were disbanded, Roadrunner Records released three Mercyful Fate compilation albums. The Beginning was released on June 24, 1987, and featured material from the band's 1982 self-titled EP, as well as rare live and studio recordings. On May 12, 1992, Return of the Vampire was released, which was another compilation of rare studio recordings. On October 6, 1992, Roadrunner released A Dangerous Meeting; a split-release featuring material from both Mercyful Fate and King Diamond.

Reunion (1992–1999)
In 1992, King Diamond, Hank Shermann, Michael Denner and Timi Hansen reunited to reform Mercyful Fate (drummer Kim Ruzz was replaced by Morten Nielsen). The result was the album In the Shadows, which was released on June 22, 1993, through Metal Blade Records. The album also featured a guest appearance by Metallica drummer Lars Ulrich (a fellow Dane), on the track "Return of the Vampire". For the album's supporting tour, Morten Nielsen was replaced by King Diamond drummer Snowy Shaw, due to a knee injury Nielsen had sustained. Bassist Timi Hansen was also replaced by Sharlee D'Angelo, as Hansen did not want to take part in touring. On June 27, 1994, the band released The Bell Witch, an EP of live tracks, as well as studio recordings from In the Shadows.

On September 25, 1994, Mercyful Fate released the album Time, which was recorded and mixed at the Dallas Sound Lab during May–August 1994. After the album's release, drummer Snowy Shaw was replaced by Bjarne T. Holm for the Time Tour. Holm had originally been asked to join Mercyful Fate back in 1981, but had declined due to prior commitments. The band spent January through February 1996 recording and mixing the album Into the Unknown, which was released on August 20, 1996. After the album's release, guitarist Michael Denner left the band and was replaced by Mike Wead. In October 1997, Mercyful Fate began recording the album Dead Again at the Nomad Recording Studio in Carrollton, Texas. Dead Again was released on June 9, 1998. In February 1999, Mercyful Fate began recording the album 9, which was released on May 15, 1999.

Hiatus and sporadic reunions (1999–2018)
After the supporting tour for 9, Mercyful Fate was put on hiatus. King Diamond focused on his eponymous band, along with guitarist Mike Wead, who joined the group during the European House of God tour. Hank Shermann and Bjarne T. Holm reunited with Michael Denner to form Force of Evil, while Sharlee D'Angelo joined the band Arch Enemy. When asked about the current state of the band in 2008, Diamond stated that Mercyful Fate is currently "hibernating", and that "it's definitely not finished, at least in my book." In August 2008, King Diamond was asked by Metallica drummer Lars Ulrich if Mercyful Fate would be willing to participate in Activision's Guitar Hero: Metallica video game. Ulrich requested the original masters for two of the band's songs, so they could be used in the game. Unable to locate them, Diamond suggested to Activision the band re-record the songs, and as a result, King Diamond, Hank Shermann, Michael Denner, Timi Hansen and Bjarne T. Holm reunited to re-record the songs "Evil" and "Curse of the Pharaohs". King Diamond was also made into a playable character in the game.

On December 7, 2011, King Diamond, Hank Shermann, Michael Denner and Timi Hansen reunited onstage at Metallica's 30th Anniversary concert, at the Fillmore in San Francisco, California, where they, alongside Metallica, performed Metallica's "Mercyful Fate" medley from Garage Inc.

On January 28, 2017 the original line-up of Mercyful Fate (minus Diamond) reunited to receive the Pioneer Prize at the Steppeulven ceremony by the Danish Association of Music Critics at the Bremen Teater in Copenhagen. This marks the first time drummer Ruzz appeared with the band after the 1985 split.

Full-time reunion (2019–present)

On August 1, 2019, it was announced that Mercyful Fate would be performing an unspecified number of concerts throughout Europe in the summer of 2020. The band's line-up consists of King Diamond on vocals, Hank Shermann on guitar, Bjarne T. Holm on drums, Mike Wead on guitar and Joey Vera on bass, the latter of whom was filling in for Timi Hansen, who was battling cancer; Vera then became their full-time bass player after Hansen died on November 4, 2019, shortly after his 61st birthday. Aside from previously released material, the band was also going to perform new songs over the course of the summer.

In a May 2020 interview with Heavy magazine, Shermann said that he had "written six or seven songs" for the band's new album. On June 2, 2022, Mercyful Fate performed their first live show since 1999 in Hanover as part of a European tour, where they debuted a brand new song titled "The Jackal of Salzburg".

Style and legacy
Mercyful Fate were a part of the first wave of black metal, along with other groups, such as Venom, Bathory, and Hellhammer. Many of these groups helped establish the style upon which future black metal artists would later build. Unlike the other first-wave bands, typical elements of Mercyful Fate's style are influences from progressive rock, epic 1970s hard rock, and traditional heavy metal. As many of the band's songs featured lyrics about Satanism and the occult and King Diamond was among the first black metal musicians to use the now famous corpse paint, Mercyful Fate was a pioneer in developing black metal, although their musical style was not as much an influence as that of other first wave bands.

Various musicians have cited Mercyful Fate as an influence. Kerry King, the guitarist for the thrash metal band Slayer, has stated, that he and Jeff Hanneman were big fans of Mercyful Fate when Slayer recorded the album Hell Awaits, so much so that the album was very influenced by Mercyful Fate. Fellow thrash metal band Metallica recorded a medley of Mercyful Fate songs on their 1998 Garage Inc. cover album. Since then, the band has performed the song various times live with several members of Mercyful Fate.

Band members

Current line-up
 King Diamond – lead vocals, keyboards (1981–1985, 1992–1999, 2008, 2011, 2019–present)
 Hank Shermann – guitars (1981–1985, 1992–1999, 2008, 2011, 2019–present)
 Bjarne T. Holm – drums (1994–1999, 2008, 2019–present)
 Mike Wead – guitars (1996–1999, 2019–present)
 Joey Vera – bass (2019–present)

Former members
 Timi Hansen – bass (1981–1985, 1992–1993, 2008, 2011, 2019; died 2019)
 Carsten Van Der Volsing – guitars (1981)
 Ole Beich – bass (1981; died 1991)
 Ole Frausing – drums (1981)
 Jan Lindblad – drums (1981)
 Nick Smith – drums (1981)
 Kim Ruzz – drums (1981–1985)
 Benny Petersen – guitars (1981-1982)
 Michael Denner – guitars (1982–1985, 1992–1996, 2008, 2011)
 Sharlee D'Angelo – bass (1993–1999)
 Morten Nielsen – drums (1992–1993)
 Snowy Shaw – drums (1993–1994)

Touring members
 Becky Baldwin - bass (2022)

Timeline

Discography

Studio albums
 Melissa (1983)
 Don't Break the Oath (1984)
 In the Shadows (1993)
 Time (1994)
 Into the Unknown (1996)
 Dead Again (1998)
 9 (1999)

References

External links

 
 

1981 establishments in Denmark
1985 disestablishments in Denmark
1992 establishments in Denmark
1999 disestablishments in Denmark
Cthulhu Mythos music
Danish black metal musical groups
Danish heavy metal musical groups
Metal Blade Records artists
Musical groups established in 1981
Musical groups disestablished in 1985
Musical groups reestablished in 1992
Musical groups disestablished in 1999
Musical quintets
Musical groups reestablished in 2019